Horseplay is a 2014 Hong Kong action comedy film directed by Lee Chi-ngai and starring Tony Leung, Ekin Cheng and Kelly Chen. The film's Cantonese and Mandarin theme song, Why Not Tonight (不如今晚) and The Best Night (最好的夜晚) respectively, was adapted from Henry Mancini's It Had Better Be Tonight with Leung, Cheng and Chen performing. Leung and Chen performed the Mandarin version at the 2014 CCTV Lunar New Year Evening on 30 January 2014.

Plot
While interviewing for a relics smuggling case in London, television hostess Ha Mui (Kelly Chen) meets multi-faced thief Nine-Tailed Fox (Tony Leung) and washed out police detective Cheung Ho (Ekin Cheng). One wants to reveal the truth, one wants to steal the "Tang dynasty Pottery Horse" and one wants to bring criminals to justice. The three of them have different goals, but they must work together to acquire the pottery. Meanwhile, Nine-Tailed Fox is being hunted down by an old enemy and must evade capture. What will be the final outcome?

Cast
Tony Leung Ka-fai as Lee Tan (李旦), known as the Nine-Tailed Fox (九尾狐), a multi-faced thief
Ekin Cheng as Cheung Ho (張浩), a police officer and Ha Mui's boyfriend
Kelly Chen as Ha Mui (夏梅), a television hostess
Eric Tsang as Mr. Round (尚環), an antique appraisal expert
Wong Cho-lam as Tung Yin (董燕), an antique appraisal expert and Heung's junior
Wang Ziyi as Butch, Lee Tan's apprentice
Wang Shuo as Chen Jun (陳俊)
Mandy Lieu as Twin assassins
Liu Kai-chi as Officer Wong (黃Sir), Cheung's ex-superior
Stephanie Che as Eva Lam (林綺華), a television hostess and Ha's friend
Luisa Maria Leitão as Ping (萍), host of the "Star Trackers"
Jeannie Chan as Lee Tan's daughter
Martin Goga as main dancer
Predrag Bjelac as Gypsy King, owner of an attraction at the Amusement Park in Prague.

Production
Horseplay was filmed on location in Prague and London. While filming a motorcycle crashing scene, Tony Leung encountered an accident where he fractured three rib bones. Due to his injury, Leung, who was scheduled to film his first TVB series Line Walker, had to withdraw from the series.

Theme song
Why Not Tonight (不如今晚) / The Best Night (最好的夜晚)
Composer: Henry Mancini
Arranger: Ted Lo
Lyricist: Abrahim Chan
Producer: Mark Lui
Singer: Tony Leung Ka-fai, Ekin Cheng, Kelly Chen

References

External links
 

2014 films
Hong Kong action comedy films
2014 action comedy films
Hong Kong slapstick comedy films
Police detective films
2010s Cantonese-language films
Films set in Prague
Films set in London
Films shot in the Czech Republic
Films shot in London
Films directed by Lee Chi-ngai
2014 comedy films
2010s Hong Kong films